Mats Gies (born 22 October 1994) is a Dutch darts player currently playing in Professional Darts Corporation events.

Gies made his first televised appearance at the 2012 Zuiderduin Masters Youth tournament in Egmond aan Zee. Four years later, in February 2016, the Dutchman reached the semi-finals of the Dutch Open men's tournament in Assen.

He played in the European Qualifying School in January 2018 and qualified for his first PDC European Tour event in May 2018, when he qualified for the 2018 European Darts Grand Prix.

In October 2018, Gies won the Western Europe Youth Qualifier in Zwolle and qualified for the 2018 PDC World Youth Championship.

References

External links

Living people
Dutch darts players
Professional Darts Corporation associate players
1994 births
21st-century Dutch people